Helen Cassaday is Professor of Behavioural Neuroscience, School of Psychology, Faculty of Science, University of Nottingham.

Education
Cassaday did her BA, MA (Hons) in Experimental Psychology, at University College, University of Oxford  (1986,1990); her PhD was in Psychopharmacology, at Institute of Psychiatry, University of London (1990)

Research
Her research is focused on investigating the underlying biology of associative learning processes, fundamental to normal cognition in animals and humans.

Her research group investigates the underlying biology of associative learning processes, fundamental to normal cognition, in laboratory rats and mice. The animal learning theories can also be applied to our understanding of age-related cognitive decline, as well as to human diseases in which associative processes are disordered.
When there is a time gap between events, we are less able to make a connection between them in learning and later memory. Thus it is harder to keep track of things that could in fact be causally related, in order - for example - to know that even distant engine noise can predict a future hazard or to anticipate dinner based on the smell of raw ingredients. The ability successfully to bridge a time gap between events is known to deteriorate with age in humans and other animals. This line of work (funded by the BBSRC) aims to identify the neural substrates of trace conditioning, and to compare these with those of delay-dependent forgetting measured in other procedures.

In schizophrenia, her team finds that learning occurs inappropriately, about stimuli that would normally be treated as irrelevant, redundant or in some other way indistinct. This line of work (funded by the MRC and Wellcome Trust) has focused on the neural substrates of selective learning. Recent work compared the effects of localised treatments within nucleus accumbens on latent inhibition, based on past experience with the cue or ‘acquired salience’, and cue competition through overshadowing, based on relative intensity of the cue or ‘intrinsic salience’.
To promote translation of these findings to our understanding of human disorder, a number of her graduate students (Ellen Migo, Ebrahim Kantini, Zhimin He, Meghan Thurston, Becci Gould) have also successfully established associative learning procedures suitable for use with human participants.

In addition to projects on selective learning mechanisms and their dysfunction, she and her colleagues have shown the validity of a non-invasive objective measure of stress in laboratory mice (Ann Fitchett, BBSRC-funded studentship, welfare remit).

Awards
Medical Research Council: Serotonin and selection for learning: Effects of systemic drug administration and neurotoxic lesions in the rat; £38K; sole applicant; 1997–1998.

The Wellcome Trust: Selectivity in associative learning: Effects of amphetamine and lesions to the nucleus accumbens in the rat; £128K; sole applicant; 1999–2002.

The Wellcome Trust (extension): Selectivity in associative learning; £24K; sole applicant; 2002–2003.

Health & Safety Executive: Identifying associative triggers for non-specific symptomatology in the workplace; £225K; joint with Eamonn Ferguson, School of Psychology; 2001-2005 (extended).

Biotechnology and Biological Sciences Research Council Committee Studentship: Effects of housing on glucocorticoids and cognition in mice; £35K; joint with Sarah Collins and Chris Barnard, School of Biology; 2002–2005.

The Wellcome Trust: The neuropharmacological substrates of stimulus associability in the rat; £374K; PI with CIs Paula Moran, School of Psychology, Simon Beckett and Charles Marsden, School of Biomedical Sciences; 2008–2011.

The Wellcome Trust: The role of dopamine receptor subtypes in selection of information for learning; £220K; CI with PI Paula Moran, School of Psychology, other CIs Kevin Fone, School of Biomedical Sciences and John Waddington, Royal College of Surgeons in Ireland; 2008–2011.

The Wellcome Trust: Biomedical Vacation Scholarship to support summer intern; 2009.
British Association of Psychopharmacology: BAP Education: In Vivo Training Initiative to support summer intern; 2009.

The Wellcome Trust: Biomedical Vacation Scholarship to support summer intern; 2010.
Biotechnology and Biological Sciences Research Council Committee: Keeping track of things: Forming associations between temporally separated events; £522K (fEC); PI with CI Kevin Fone, School of Biomedical Sciences, and Researcher CI Marie Pezze; 2013–2016.

Publications
Cassaday has published numerous peer reviewed journal articles and contributed to many academic books.

References

Academics of the University of Nottingham
Living people
British neuroscientists
British women neuroscientists
Alumni of the University of Oxford
Alumni of the University of London
Year of birth missing (living people)
Place of birth missing (living people)